Christopher Gutiérrez (born April 22, 1991) is an American mixed martial artist and  currently competing in the bantamweight division of the Ultimate Fighting Championship. As of March 7, 2023, he is #13 in the UFC bantamweight rankings.

Background
Gutiérrez is an American whose mother, Gladis Canoral, is Guatemalan, and his father, Jorge Gutiérrez, is Colombian. He started training in mixed martial arts in Greenville Texas at the age of 16 and competed in his first professional fight two years later.

Mixed martial arts career

Early career
Gutiérrez started fighting MMA professionally in 2013. He has fought under numerous organizations, notably World Series of Fighting and Legacy Fighting Alliance.

Ultimate Fighting Championship
Gutiérrez  made his UFC debut on  November 30, 2018 at The Ultimate Fighter 28 Finale against Raoni Barcelos. He lost the fight via a submission.

Gutiérrez's second fight came on March 23, 2019, facing Ryan MacDonald, at UFC Fight Night: Thompson vs. Pettis. He won the fight via unanimous decision.

Gutiérrez faced Geraldo de Freitas on August 10, 2019 at UFC Fight Night: Shevchenko vs. Carmouche 2. He won the fight via a split decision.

Gutiérrez faced Vince Morales on May 30, 2020 at UFC on ESPN: Woodley vs. Burns. Utilising high volume of leg kicks, he won the fight via technical knockout in round two.

Gutiérrez was expected to face Luke Sanders on August 1, 2020 at UFC Fight Night: Brunson vs. Shahbazyan. However, Sanders was removed from the bout in mid-July for undisclosed reasons and replaced by promotional newcomer Cody Durden. The fight ended in draw.

Gutiérrez faced Andre Ewell on February 13, 2021 at UFC 258.
He won the fight via unanimous decision.

Gutiérrez faced Felipe Colares  on October 9, 2021 at UFC Fight Night 194. He won the fight via split decision.

Gutiérrez, as a replacement for Montel Jackson, faced Danaa Batgerel on March 26, 2022 at UFC on ESPN 33. He won the fight via spinning backfist TKO in the second round. The win also earned Gutiérrez his first Performance of the Night award.

Gutiérrez faced Frankie Edgar on November 12, 2022, at UFC 281. He won the bout after knocking out Edgar with a knee in the first round.

Gutiérrezis scheduled to face Pedro Munhoz on April 15, 2023 at UFC on ESPN 44.

Personal life
Gutiérrez has a son from his previous relationship.

Championships and accomplishments

Mixed martial arts
Ultimate Fighting Championship
 Performance of the Night (One time)

Mixed martial arts record 

|-
|Win
|align=center|19–4–2
|Frankie Edgar
|KO (knee)
|UFC 281
| 
|align=center|1
|align=center|2:01
|New York City, New York, United States
|
|-
|Win
|align=center|18–4–2
|Danaa Batgerel
|TKO (spinning backfist and elbows)
|UFC on ESPN: Blaydes vs. Daukaus
|
|align=center|2
|align=center|2:34
|Columbus, Ohio, United States
|
|-
|Win
|align=center|17–4–2
|Felipe Colares
|Decision (split)
|UFC Fight Night: Dern vs. Rodriguez
|
|align=center|3
|align=center|5:00
|Las Vegas, Nevada, United States
|{{small|
|-
|Win
|align=center|16–4–2
|Andre Ewell
|Decision (unanimous)
|UFC 258
|
|align=center|3
|align=center|5:00
|Las Vegas, Nevada, United States
|
|-
|Draw
|align=center|15–4–2
|Cody Durden
|Draw (unanimous)
|UFC Fight Night: Brunson vs. Shahbazyan 
|
|align=center|3
|align=center|5:00
|Las Vegas, Nevada, United States
|
|-
|Win
|align=center|15–4–1
|Vince Morales
|TKO (leg kicks)
|UFC on ESPN: Woodley vs. Burns
|
|align=center|2
|align=center|4:27
|Las Vegas, Nevada, United States
|
|-
|Win
|align=center|14–4–1
|Geraldo de Freitas
|Decision (split)
|UFC Fight Night: Shevchenko vs. Carmouche 2
|
|align=center|3
|align=center|5:00
|Montevideo, Uruguay
|
|-
|Win
|align=center|13–4–1
|Ryan MacDonald
|Decision (unanimous)
|UFC Fight Night: Thompson vs. Pettis
|
|align=center|3
|align=center|5:00
|Nashville, Tennessee, United States
|
|-
|Loss
|align=center|12–4–1
|Raoni Barcelos
|Submission (rear-naked choke)
|The Ultimate Fighter: Heavy Hitters Finale
|
|align=center|2
|align=center|4:12
|Las Vegas, Nevada, United States
|
|-
|Win
|align=center|12–3–1
|Ray Rodriguez
|Submission (rear-naked choke)
|LFA 52
|
|align=center|1
|align=center|4:47
|Belton, Texas, United States
|
|-
|Win
|align=center|11–3–1
|Jimmy Flick
|TKO (leg kicks)
|Xtreme Fight Night 347
|
|align=center|3
|align=center|2:59
|Tulsa, Oklahoma, United States
|
|-
|Win
|align=center|
|Mario Israel
|Decision (split)
|LFA 22
|
|align=center|3
|align=center|5:00
|Broomfield, Colorado, United States
|
|-
|Loss
|align=center|9–3–1
|Jerrod Sanders
|Decision (unanimous)
|C3 Fights
|
|align=center|3
|align=center|5:00
|Newkirk, Oklahoma, United States
|
|-
|Loss
|align=center|9–2–1
|Timur Valiev
|Decision (unanimous)
|WSOF 33
|
|align=center|3
|align=center|5:00
|Kansas City, Missouri, United States
|
|-
|Win
|align=center|9–1–1
|Timur Valiev
|Decision (split)
|WSOF 28
|
|align=center|3
|align=center|5:00
|Garden Grove, California, United States
|
|-
|Win
|align=center|8–1–1
|Bendy Casimir
|Decision (unanimous)
|SCS 27
|
|align=center|5
|align=center|5:00
|Hinton, Oklahoma, United States
|
|-
|Win
|align=center|7–1–1
|Aaron Phillips
|TKO (retirement)
|World Fighting Championships 35
|
|align=center|3
|align=center|5:00
|Baton Rouge, Louisiana, United States
|
|-
|Win
|align=center|6–1–1
|Craig Ross
|TKO (punches)
|SCS 23
|
|align=center|1
|align=center|0:42
|Hinton, Oklahoma, United States
|
|-
|Win
|align=center|5–1–1
|Tyler Shinn
|Decision (split)
|BattleGrounds MMA 5
|
|align=center|3
|align=center|5:00
|Tulsa, Oklahoma, United States
|
|-
|Win
|align=center|4–1–1
|Evan Woolsey
|Decision (unanimous)
|Battle at the Fort 9
|
|align=center|3
|align=center|5:00
|Hays, Kansas, United States
|
|-
|Win
|align=center|3–1–1
|Justin McNally
|TKO (punches)
|Bellator 111
|
|align=center|1
|align=center|2:50
|Thackerville, Oklahoma, United States
|
|-
|Draw
|align=center|2–1–1
|Brandon Seyler
|Draw (majority)
|Xtreme Knockout 20
|
|align=center|3
|align=center|3:00
|Arlington, Texas, United States
|
|-
|Loss
|align=center|2–1
|Jake Constant
|Decision (split)
|C3 Fights: Fall Brawl 2013
|
|align=center|3
|align=center|5:00
|Newkirk, Oklahoma, United States
|
|-
|Win
|align=center|2–0
|Tristan Grimsley
|TKO (punches)
|Xtreme Knockout 19
|
|align=center|2
|align=center|0:19
|Dallas, Texas, United States
|
|-
|Win
|align=center|1–0
|Dawond Pickney
|TKO (punches)
|Ring Rulers: Spa City Stomp Out Hunger
|
|align=center|3
|align=center|1:51
|Hot Springs, Arkansas, United States
|
|-

See also
 List of current UFC fighters
 List of male mixed martial artists

References

External links
 
 

1991 births
Living people
American male mixed martial artists
Bantamweight mixed martial artists
Mixed martial artists utilizing Brazilian jiu-jitsu
American practitioners of Brazilian jiu-jitsu
Sportspeople from Texas
Mixed martial artists from Texas
Ultimate Fighting Championship male fighters
American people of Guatemalan descent
American sportspeople of North American descent
Sportspeople of Guatemalan descent
American sportspeople of Colombian descent